A running in board is a large sign showing the name of the railway station on which it is found. The signs are intended to inform passengers of their location when on a train entering the station, possibly while still moving at speed. Some signs display the names of the previous and following stations on the line.

In normal circumstances a two-platform station has one running in board on each platform situated near that end of the platform to which trains serving the platform run in - hence 'running in board'.

During the Second World War, running in boards in the United Kingdom were removed or obscured to prevent enemy spies or paratroopers from easily discovering their location.

External links
Running In Boards - Southern e-group.

Railway stations